Craccracriccrecr is a 1999 studio album by Italian rock band Elio e le Storie Tese. It is the first album by the band after the death of long-time member Feiez, who died in 1998.

Track listing

    "Craccracriccracker" – 0:30
    "Evviva" – 1:07
    "La visione" – 3:50
    "Il Rock and Roll" – 7:42
    "La bella canzone di una volta" – 3:31
    "Che felicità" – 3:01
    "Farmacista" – 3:59
    "Bobbi Burrs (Baby Birds)" – 3:09
    "Nudo e senza cacchio" – 4:05
    "Mustasì" – 3:05
    "Beatles, Rolling Stones e Bob Dylan" – 2:42
    "Caro 2000" – 4:11
    "Bacio" – 3:25
    "Sogno o son desktop" – 4:05
    "Discomusic" – 5:08
    "Bis" – 4:32

Personnel
Stefano Belisari as Elio - vocals
Sergio Conforti as Rocco Tanica - keyboards
Davide Civaschi as Cesareo - guitars
Nicola Fasani as Faso - bass
Christian Meyer - drums
Guest musicians
Feiez - sax solo on track 1, vocals and banjo on track 8, tambourine and cocktail shaker on track 15
Elena Belfiore - vocals on track 4
Daniele Comoglio - sax on tracks 2, 5, 6, 12, 14 and 15 
Vittorio Cosma - keyboards, backing vocals
Mangoni - rapping on track 3
Simone Alberghini - vocals on tracks 4 and 7
Massimiliano Gagliardo - vocals on track 4 and 7
Elena Rossi - vocals on track 4 and 7
Stefano Bollani - vocals on track 5
Max Costa - drums on track 5
Demo Morselli - trumpet on tracks 5, 12 and 15
Ambrogio Frigerio - trombone on tracks 5, 12, 15
Giorgio Bracardi - vocals on track 6
Trio di Piadeena - background vocals on track 6
Paolo Costa - bass on tracks 7 and 11
Zuffellato - claps on track 11
Curt Cress - drums on track 15

References

External links

1999 albums
Elio e le Storie Tese albums
Italian-language albums